The Triṃśikā-vijñaptimātratā (Sanskrit), also known simply as the Triṃśikā or occasionally by is English translation Thirty Verses on Manifestation Only, is a brief poetic treatise by the Indian Buddhist monk Vasubandhu. It was composed in the 4th or 5th century CE and became one of the core texts for the Yogācāra school of Mahāyāna Buddhism. In it he touches on foundational Yogācāra concepts such as the storehouse consciousness, the afflicted mental consciousness, and the three natures, among others. Together with the Vimśatikā form a standard summary of Vasubandhu's understanding of Yogācāra.

Manuscripts and translations 
The Triṃśikā was translated into Chinese by Xuanzang in 648 CE at Hongfu Monastery. It was also translated into Tibetan in antiquity. A version in the original Sanskrit also survives.

Commentaries 
In India, the most influential commentary on the Triṃśikā was written by Sthiramati in the 6th century. According to Xuanzang, who studied the Triṃśikā at Nalanda in the 7th century under Śīlabhadra, there were 10 known prose commentaries on the text. These were by Sthiramati, Dharmapala of Nalanda, Nanda, Citrabhānu, Guṇamati, Jinamitra, Jñānamitra, Jñānacandra, Bandhuśrī, Śuddhacandra, and Jinaputra. Xuanzang initially intended to translate all of these, but on the advice of his students, especially Kuiji, Xuanzang instead chose to combine them into a single text that focused primarily on Dharmapala's commentary. He did so because his teacher Śīlabhadra was a student of Dharmapala, and thus Xuanzang believed Dharmapala's interpretation to be the most accurate. Among the others commentators, Xuanzang most often included excerpts from Sthiramati, Nanda, and Citrabhānu, but usually only to provide contrast with Dharmapala. The result of this work was the Cheng Weishi Lun, which became the most important text for the tradition of East Asian Yogācāra. Xuanzang's student Kuiji in turn created his own commentary on this text, the Cheng weishi lun shuji.

After Xuanzang's pilgrimage, Indian commentary on the Triṃśikā continued to be produced. In the late 7th century or early 8th century, Vinītadeva, also working at Nalanda, produced commentaries on both the Triṃśikā and the Vimśatikā which survive in Tibetan translation and some Sanskrit fragments.

References

External links 

 
 Digital Dictionary of Buddhism (log in with userID "guest")
 Johnson, Peter Lunde, trans., (2018) a translation of The Thirty Stanzas of Verse On There Only Being The Virtual Nature of Consciousness (Vijñapti Matratā Triṃśikā Kārikāḥ (唯識三十論頌)  from The Discourse On Realizing There is Only The Virtual Nature of Consciousness (Vijñapti Matratā Siddhi, 成唯識論), An Lac Publications, 

Mahayana texts
Yogacara
Yogacara shastras